Mitochondrial uncoupling protein 4 is a protein that in humans is encoded by the SLC25A27 gene.

Mitochondrial uncoupling proteins (UCP) are members of the larger family of mitochondrial anion carrier proteins (MACP). UCPs separate oxidative phosphorylation from ATP synthesis with energy dissipated as heat, also referred to as the mitochondrial proton leak. UCPs facilitate the transfer of anions from the inner to the outer mitochondrial membrane and the return transfer of protons from the outer to the inner mitochondrial membrane. They also reduce the mitochondrial membrane potential in mammalian cells. Tissue specificity occurs for the different UCPs and the exact methods of how UCPs transfer H+/OH- are not known. UCPs contain the three homologous protein domains of MACPs. Transcripts of this gene are detected only in brain tissue and are specifically modulated by various environmental conditions. Recently, the proton transport activity of UCP4 has also been shown to be activated by fatty acids and inhibited by purine nucleotides. In addition, reconstituted UCP4 exhibited a distinct conformation, compared to other UCPs in the family.

See also
 Solute carrier family
 Uncoupling protein

References

Further reading

Solute carrier family